Felipe Pereyra (born 22 September 1942) is an Argentine boxer. He competed in the men's welterweight event at the 1964 Summer Olympics.

References

External links
 

1942 births
Living people
Argentine male boxers
Olympic boxers of Argentina
Boxers at the 1964 Summer Olympics
Place of birth missing (living people)
Welterweight boxers
Pan American Games medalists in boxing
Pan American Games bronze medalists for Argentina
Medalists at the 1963 Pan American Games
Boxers at the 1963 Pan American Games